David Peel (19 June 1920 – 4 September 1981) was an English film and television actor.

He was born in London on 19 June 1920. He attended the Royal Academy of Dramatic Art and was a minor player in a few films. In 1960, he was cast in the starring role of Baron Meinster in Hammer Film Productions’ The Brides of Dracula. After appearing in The Hands of Orlac later in the year, he retired from the film industry and became an estate agent and antiques dealer. He died in London on 4 September 1981 aged 61.

Selected filmography
 Squadron Leader X (1943)
 We Dive at Dawn (1943)
 Escape to Danger (1943)
 They Who Dare (1954)
 The Brides of Dracula (1960)
 The Hands of Orlac (1960)

References

External links

 

1920 births
1981 deaths
English male film actors
English male television actors
Male actors from London
Alumni of RADA
20th-century English male actors